Following the Nepalese Constituent Assembly Election on 10 April 2008, the Communist Party of Nepal (Maoist Centre)  formed a government out of the 1st Nepalese Constituent Assembly led by Pushpa Kamal Dahal and backed by the Communist Party of Nepal (Unified Marxist–Leninist),
Madhesi Jana Adhikar Forum, Nepal, Sadbhavana Party, Janamorcha Nepal and the Communist Party of Nepal (United).

Ministers

References 

Government of Nepal
Cabinet of Nepal
2008 in Nepal
2008 establishments in Nepal
2009 disestablishments in Nepal